Ruslan Khazhismelovich Apekov (born 8 June 2000) is a Russian football player who plays for FC Akron Tolyatti on loan from FC Krasnodar.

Club career
He made his debut in the Russian Professional Football League for FC Krasnodar-2 on 21 April 2018 in a game against FC Chernomorets Novorossiysk. He made his Russian Football National League debut for Krasnodar-2 on 7 September 2019 in a game against FC Spartak-2 Moscow.

He made his Russian Premier League debut for FC Krasnodar on 12 December 2021 against FC Nizhny Novgorod.

On 16 January 2023, Apekov joined FC Akron Tolyatti on loan until the end of the 2022–23 season, with an option to buy.

Career statistics

References

External links
 
 

2000 births
Sportspeople from Nalchik
Living people
Russian footballers
Association football forwards
FC Krasnodar players
FC Krasnodar-2 players
FC Akron Tolyatti players
Russian First League players
Russian Second League players
Russian Premier League players